The Al and Barrie Zesiger Sports and Fitness Center (informally known as the "Z Center") is the central athletics facility at the Massachusetts Institute of Technology since 2002. It is connected to Rockwell Cage, du Pont Gymnasium and the Johnson Athletic Center. MIT's Department of Athletics, Physical Education and Recreation (DAPER) administrative offices are also housed in the Z Center. It is  designed by Kevin Roche and John Dinkeloo & Associates

Facilities include:
 50-meter lap pool
 25-yard instructional pool
 Two fitness floors
 Multi-activity court
 6 squash courts
 Massage suite and stretching and exercise spaces

See also 
Architecture of the Massachusetts Institute of Technology

External links 
 Official webpage

2002 establishments in Massachusetts
Massachusetts Institute of Technology buildings
Roche-Dinkeloo buildings
Sports in Cambridge, Massachusetts
Sports venues completed in 2002
Sports venues in Middlesex County, Massachusetts
Swimming in Massachusetts